HBS may refer to:

Education 
 Harvard Business School, in Boston, Massachusetts, United States
 Henley Business School of the University of Reading
 Henrietta Barnett School, in London, England
 Hitchin Boys' School, in Hertfordshire, England
 Hogere Burgerschool, a defunct Dutch secondary school type

Music 
 The Hairbrain Scheme, an American band
 Her Bright Skies, a Swedish post-hardcore band
 Historic Brass Society, an international music organization

Other uses 
Hapoel Be'er Sheva F.C., an Israeli association football team
 Croatian Cycling Federation
 Haemoglobin S (HbS)
 HBS Craeyenhout, a sports organization, The Hague, Netherlands
 HBS Craeyenhout (football club), a Dutch association football team
 Heinrich Böll Foundation, a German political foundation
 Saline (medicine), HEPES-buffered Saline (HBS)
 Hexagonal bilayer silica 
 Himanta Biswa Sarma, 15th Chief Minister of the Indian state of Assam
 Hoboken Shore Railroad, a defunct railway in New Jersey, US
 Honmon Butsuryū-shū, a Buddhist sect in Japan
 Hunan Broadcasting System, China
 Harebrained Schemes, a video game developer company.
 ISO 639-3 code for the Serbo-Croatian language